Taxkorgan Tajik Autonomous County (often shortened to Taxkorgan County and also spelled Tashkurgan or Tashkorgan) is an autonomous county of Kashgar Prefecture in Western Xinjiang, China. The county seat is the town of Tashkurgan. The county is the only Tajik autonomous county in China.

History 

During the Han dynasty, Taxkorgan was known as Puli; during the Tang dynasty, it was a protectorate of the Sassanids, during the Yuan dynasty it was part of the Chaghatai empire. It was part of China during the Qing dynasty, the Taxkorgan Tajik Autonomous County was created in 1954 and is part of the district of Kashgar.

Many centuries later, Tashkurgan became the capital of the Sarikol kingdom, a kingdom of the Pamir Mountains, and later of Qiepantuo under the Persian Empire. At the northeast corner of the town is a huge fortress known as the Princess Castle dating from the Yuan dynasty (1279–1368 CE) and the subject of many colourful local legends. A ruined fire temple is near the fortress.

The region came under Chinese rule from Qing dynasty, to Republic of China and People's Republic of China.

On September 17, 1954, Taxkorgan was made an autonomous region. In February 1955, it was made an autonomous county.

In 1955, Bulungkol was transferred to Akto County from Tashkurgan County.

In August 2013, the Chinese Academy of Social Sciences announced that they excavated a cluster of Zoroastrian tombs in Taxkorgan.

In May 2017, the county was hit with a magnitude 5.5 earthquake that killed eight and injured 29.

Geography 
Taxkorgan County is located in the eastern part of the Pamir Plateau, where the Kunlun, Karakoram, Hindukush and Tian Shan mountains come together, at the borders with Afghanistan (Wakhan Corridor), Tajikistan (Gorno-Badakhshan Province), Pakistan (Gilgit-Baltistan) and India (Ladakh). The county seat is Taxkorgan Town.

The county includes a significant part of the Trans-Karakoram Tract, disputed by India and Pakistan in the ongoing Kashmir conflict; while Pakistan and China settled the border issue in 1963, India continues to claim it as part of the state of Jammu and Kashmir.

By including the Trans-Karakoram Tract, the county also borders several eight-thousanders, including K2, at  the second-highest mountain in the world. There are several hot springs and resources of gold, iron, and copper.

Climate
Taxkorgan has a cold desert climate (Köppen BWk), influenced by the high elevation, with long, very cold winters, and warm summers. An average of only  of precipitation falls per year

Administrative divisions 
The county administers 12 towns and townships, which then administer 50 village-level divisions.

 Mazar sheep farm
 Buhoi Jirap farm
 Dairy farm
 Bazadax forest farm()

Demographics 

As of 2018, Taxkorgan County had a population of 40,999, up slightly from the 40,381 reported in 2015, and the 37,843 counted in the 2010 Chinese Census.

Ethnic composition 

Mountain Tajiks make up a supermajority of the county's population, with recent figures indicating they make up somewhere from 80.9% of the population, to 82.24%. Other prominent ethnic groups include the Han Chinese, the Kyrgyz, and Uyghurs.

In 1999, 6.28% of the population of Taxkorgan (Tashiku'ergan) County was Han Chinese and 5.08% of the population was Uyghur.

In 1995, the total population of Taxkorgan was 27,800, among them 84% Tajiks of Xinjiang, who speak the Sarikoli language, 4% Han and 12% other nationalities.

Economy
Animal husbandry is the primary economic mode with agriculture. The well-known Dunbashi fat-tailed sheep are raised in the county as well as domestic yaks. Agricultural products include highland barley, wheat, and others. Mineral resources include iron, sulfur, and asbestos. In 2011, the county was considered relatively poor. 90% of the residents were engaged in animal husbandry.

The annual per capita disposable income 2018 totaled ¥29,053 for the county's urban residents, and ¥7,630 for the county's rural residents. These figures increased 6.7% and 10.2%, respectively, from 2017.

In 2019, the county government reported that the county has 17 impoverished villages, and 893 households with 3682 people in poverty.

Transportation 
The county is served by Karakoram Highway, which runs through Taxkorgan Town. As of September 2016, China has begun building an elevated road which is expected to be completed in a few years. Taxkorgan Airport is now under construction and will be in service in 2022.

See also
 Afghanistan–China border
 Chalachigu Valley
 China–Tajikistan border
 Shaksgam River
 Taghdumbash Pamir
 Tashkurgan Nature Reserve
 Yarkand River

Notes

References

External links 

 Official website of Taxkorgan Tajik Autonomous County government 

 
Autonomous counties of the People's Republic of China
Iranian languages regions
Tajiks of Xinjiang
Kashgar Prefecture
County-level divisions of Xinjiang